Joe Biden, the 46th president of the United States, has received numerous honors in recognition of his career in politics. These include:

National honors

Foreign honors

Scholastic

 Chancellor, visitor, governor, rector and fellowships

Honorary degrees

Awards

Freedom of the City
  25 June 2016: County Louth.

References

Awards and honors
Lists of awards and honors received by presidents of the United States